{{DISPLAYTITLE:C6H15NO2}}
The molecular formula C6H15NO2 (molar mass: 133.189 g/mol, exact mass: 133.1103 u) may refer to:

 Aminoacetaldehyde_diethylacetal
 Diisopropanolamine

Molecular formulas